In terms of gross tonnage, the largest ferry in the world is the 75,156-ton Color Magic, built by Aker Finnyards of Finland, and operated by Color Line on the route between Oslo in Norway and Kiel in Germany. Its sister ship Color Fantasy comes a close second in tonnage. As a measure of the total internal volume of a ship, gross tonnage is most commonly used to compare the size of civilian ships. However, single dimensions are also often compared. For example, Cruise Roma became the longest ferry in the world after being lengthened in 2019. The cruiseferry Silja Europa with a gross tonnage of around 60,000 tonnes can carry up to 3,750 passengers, more than any other ferry in Europe.

Notes

Europe
Cruiseferries
Transport-related lists of superlatives